Qoldarreh-ye Sofla (also Romanized as Qoldarreh-ye Soflá; also known as Qowldarreh-ye Soflá) is a village in Karaftu Rural District, in the Central District of Takab County, West Azerbaijan Province, Iran. At the 2006 census, its population was 279, in 48 families.

References 

Populated places in Takab County